Pop & Rock (stylized as ) was a Greek magazine, founded in 1978 by Giannis Petridis, Kostas Zougris and Vassos Tsimidopoulos. After its first issue, it became a popular music magazine in Greece.

Petridis and Zougris had been thinking about publishing a magazine for a while, but did not have the money to do so. By coincidence, publisher Aris Gritzalis met with Petridis and asked him about publishing a music magazine. Petridis and Zougris were then joined by Tsimidopoulos, who was a close friend of Petridis, and who also wrote in the first issues. The name came about when Tsimidopoulos suggested modelling it from the name of the French magazine Rock & Folk, with Zougris coming up with Pop & Rock.

Its headquarters were in Kallithea and the first issue was in March 1978 and featured Jimi Hendrix on the front cover. The magazine covered a wide variety of genres and topics and, from 1980, it published a monthly sales chart. After its formation in the late 1980s, the charts published in the magazine were commissioned by IFPI Greece.

Petridis was also director until 1998, when he resigned. The magazine changed publisher many times, but due to fewer and fewer sales and financial difficulties, the magazine closed in 2012.

References

External links 
 Official website (in Greek)

1978 establishments in Greece
Defunct magazines published in Greece
Greek-language magazines
Magazines established in 1978
Mass media in Athens
Music magazines
Magazines disestablished in 2012
2012 disestablishments in Greece